St Michael's Church is in Church Lane, North Rode, Cheshire, England.  It is an active Anglican parish church in the deanery of Macclesfield, the archdeaconry of Macclesfield, and the diocese of Chester.  Its benefice is combined with those of St Mary the Virgin, Bosley, St Saviour, Wildboarclough, and St Michael, Wincle.  The church is recorded in the National Heritage List for England as a designated Grade II listed building. The authors of the Buildings of England series describe it as "a charming estate church".

History

St Michael's was built in 1845–46, and designed by Charles and James Trubshaw.

Architecture

Exterior
The church is constructed in rubble stone with ashlar dressings, and has a tiled roof.  Its plan consists of a four-bay nave, a south porch, a two-bay chancel with a vestry to the northeast, and a west tower.  The tower has angle buttresses and a plain parapet.  In the angle between the tower and the nave on the north side is a stair turret which rises above the height of the tower, and contains round-headed casement windows.  On the west side of the tower is a doorway with a semicircular head in a loosely Romanesque style, which is decorated with spaced chevron motifs.  Above the door is a two-light window in loosely Early English style, with a circular clock face above that.  On each side of the top stage are three lancet bell openings.  The south porch has a loosely Romanesque doorway, above which is a niche containing a statue of Saint Michael.  The windows along the sides of the church are in Early English style.

Interior
Inside the church, the nave has a hammerbeam roof.  Both the nave and the chancel are floored with encaustic tiles.  In the church are four brass corona chandeliers.  The font is decorated with encaustic tiles.  In the church are memorials to the Daintry and Tootal Broadhurst families.  The stained glass is described as being "delightfully bad".

See also

Listed buildings in North Rode

References

Church of England church buildings in Cheshire
Grade II listed churches in Cheshire
Churches completed in 1846
19th-century Church of England church buildings
Gothic Revival church buildings in England
Gothic Revival architecture in Cheshire
Romanesque Revival church buildings in England
Diocese of Chester